Agape Baptist Academy was a Christian boarding school located near the city of Stockton, Missouri that functioned from 1990 until 2023.

History 
Agape Baptist Academy was founded by James Clemensen. It originally opened in the state of Washington on an old air force base, but it moved due to problems with asbestos. In 1996, the school moved to Cedar County in Missouri when they arrived in the local area they held several small events such as a blood drives and other charitable events. Serious allegations of the violent treatment and sexual abuse of students have been made. In May 2003 an F3 Tornado struck the school and the cafeteria building roof was ripped off.

References

External links 

Boarding schools in Missouri
Buildings and structures in Cedar County, Missouri
Boys' schools in Missouri
Educational institutions established in 1990
2023 disestablishments in the United States
1990 establishments in Missouri
Christian schools in Missouri